This is the list of cathedrals in Cameroon.

Roman Catholic 
Cathedrals of the Roman Catholic Church in Cameroon:
 Cathedral of St. Joseph in Bafoussam
 St. Joseph's Metropolitan Cathedral in Bamenda
 Cathedral of Our Lady in Batouri
 Holy Family Cathedral in Bertoua
 Regina Pacis Cathedral in Buéa
 Cathedral of Sts. Peter and Paul in Douala
 Cathedral of St. Ann and St. Joachim in Ebolowa
 Cathedral of Our Lady of Fatima in Eseka
 Cathedral of St. Theresa of the Child Jesus in Garoua
 Cathedral of St. Joseph in Kribi
 St. Theresa Cathedral in Kumbo
 St. Joseph's Cathedral in Mamfe
 Cathedral of Our Lady of the Assumption in Maroua
 Cathedral of the Holy Rosary in Mbalmayo
 Cathedral of Our Lady of the Apostles in Ngaoundéré
 Cathedral of Our Lady in Sangmélima
 Cathedral of St. Ann in Yagoua
 Cathedral of Our Lady of Victories in Yaoundé

See also
List of cathedrals
 Roman Catholic Archdiocese of Douala

References

Catholic Church in Cameroon
Churches in Cameroon
Cameroon
Cathedrals
Cathedrals